Kim Min-young (born 26 January, 1990) is a South Korean actress. She is best known for her supporting roles in Hi! School: Love On, Guardian: The Lonely and Great God and Plus Nine Boys. Kim also appeared in the famous and popular drama of School series, Who Are You: School 2015 as Jin Kwon. Kim also did lead roles in movies such as Sunny (2011 film) and Makgeolli Girls. She also had a lead role in drama, Coffee, Do Me a Favor.

Filmography

Film

Television series

References

External links 
 
 

1990 births
Living people
21st-century South Korean actresses
South Korean female models
South Korean television actresses
South Korean film actresses